Remlinger Farms is a  working farm located in Carnation, Washington, and listed in the Library of Congress Local Legacies Project.  It is open to the public for 6 months of the year with amusement rides, entertainment, u-pick fields and corn mazes specializing in local produce. It was originally created from the Remlinger family farm, owned by Floyd Remlinger, before being taken over by his son, Gary Remlinger.

History 

Beginning in 1965, and starting with little more than gunny sacks of corn sold for $1.00 each, the farm has evolved and grown much larger, adding a farm market, amusement rides, theater, petting zoo, restaurant, and the Tolt River Railroad Steam Train Ride pulled by a genuine steam engine (built by Crown Metal Products) that travels on a figure 8,  narrow gauge track within the farm.

Activities 

During the spring and fall, the farm hosts educational school tours allowing schoolchildren the chance to see a working farm, ride on the amusement rides (including a small roller coaster), learn about farm animals and even get up close to them, from cows to bees, safely.

The farm hosts a month-long pumpkin patch for the entire month of October, ending its year on Halloween.

References

External links 

 

Buildings and structures in King County, Washington
Tourist attractions in King County, Washington
Farms in Washington (state)